Jorge Soler was an Argentine gymnast who competed in the 1948 Summer Olympics and the 1951 Pan American Games.

References

External links
  

Gymnasts at the 1948 Summer Olympics
Olympic gymnasts of Argentina
Year of birth missing
Possibly living people
Pan American Games medalists in gymnastics
Pan American Games gold medalists for Argentina
Gymnasts at the 1951 Pan American Games
Argentine male artistic gymnasts
Medalists at the 1951 Pan American Games
20th-century Argentine people